George W. Germain, also spelled George W. Jermain, (June 4, 1818April 15, 1906) was a Michigan politician.

Early life
Germain was born on June 4, 1818 in Marcellus, New York. IN 1843, Germain bought a farm in North Plains Township, Michigan.

Career
In 1841, Germain was appointed by the Governor of Michigan to the position of Michigan State Treasurer. He served in this position until the Michigan Legislature appointed John J. Adam to replace him on January 13, 1842. At first, Germain was a member of the Whig Party and held similar beliefs to that of William H. Seward and Horace Greeley. By 1856, Germain had become a Republican. On November 4, 1856, Germain was elected to the Michigan House of Representatives, where he represented the Ionia County 1st district from January 7, 1857 to December 31, 1858. He was among the first Republicans elected to the state legislature. In 1867, Germain served as a delegate from Ionia County in the Michigan state constitutional convention.

Personal life
Germain married Abigail Bliss Coates.

Death
Germain died on April 15, 1906 in Ionia County. He was interred at North Plains Cemetery in Ionia, Michigan.

References

1818 births
1906 deaths
Burials in Michigan
Farmers from Michigan
Michigan Republicans
Michigan Whigs
People from Ionia County, Michigan
People from Marcellus, New York
State treasurers of Michigan
19th-century American politicians